Chã Preta is a municipality located in the Brazilian state of Alagoas. Its population is 7,311 (2020) and its area is 201 km².

References

Municipalities in Alagoas